Chris Victor  is an American college basketball head coach who is currently the head coach at Seattle University.

Playing career
Victor attended Concordia–Irvine from 2001 to 2004. He helped lead Concordia to a NAIA title in 2003. Victor scored a season high 26 points and had 9 assists in the title game. During his senior season, Concordia again reached the NAIA championship game.

Coaching career
Victor began his coaching career as an assistant under Rick Croy at Citrus College in 2005, leading his team to 17 wins in his only season. Victor became an assistant at Concordia–Irvine in 2006 and helped the team to a 119-22 record. The team won three out of four Golden State Athletic Conference Championships and reached the NAIA championship game in 2007. Victor was hired as head coach at Citrus College in 2010. In his first season, he led the team to a 27-6 record and helped the team reach the CCCAA State Regional Finals. Victor served as head coach of Citrus College from 2010 to 2015, compiling a 103-39 record. In June 2015, he joined Eastern Washington as an assistant under Jim Hayford. Hayford was hired as head coach of Seattle in 2017, and Victor was named assistant coach. In four seasons, Victor helped the team to a 64-55 record.

Hayford was placed on administrative leave on November 5, 2021, following an investigation that indicated he used racial slurs. Victor coached the Redhawks as they opened their season with a 69-66 win over Alcorn State. On November 11, Hayford officially resigned and Victor was named interim head coach. On March 1, 2022, Victor’s status as interim head coach was rescinded, and he was officially named Seattle’s head coach.

Head coaching record

Junior college

College

References

External links
Seattle Redhawks profile

Living people
American men's basketball coaches
Basketball coaches from California
Concordia Eagles men's basketball players
Concordia Eagles men's basketball coaches
Citrus Owls men's basketball coaches
College men's basketball head coaches in the United States
Eastern Washington Eagles men's basketball coaches
Seattle Redhawks men's basketball coaches
Year of birth missing (living people)